Nang or nangs may refer to:

 Nang County, Nyingchi, Tibet, China
 Nang yai, a form of shadow play
 Nang!, a general interest magazine
 Nang, a slang term for nitrous oxide (N2O, laughing gas) when used as a recreational drug; or for whipped-cream chargers.
 Nang, Leh, a village in Ladakh, India
 "Nangs", a Tame Impala song in the 2015 album Currents
 Naan (Chinese:馕, pinyin:náng), a leavened, oven-baked or tawa-fried flatbread.

People named Nang:
 Che Nang (14th century), Annamese vassal king of Champa
 Nang Keo Phimpha (14th century), Laotian ruler
 Philibert Nang (born 1967), Gabonese mathematician